Princess Suryeong was a Goryeo Royal Princess as the first and eldest daughter of King Gangjong when he was still a crown prince, from his first wife who was the daughter of Yi Ui-bang. She was the half sister (possibly older) of King Gojong.

Biography

Early life
She was born as the eldest daughter of Crown Prince Wang Suk and Crown Princess Yi during her grandfather, King Myeongjong's reign. However, after her maternal grandfather was assassinated in the coup led by Jeong Gyun (정균), son of Jeong Jung-bu (정중부), her mother was unable to gain the position of queen consort and got expelled from the palace as a result.

Although her birth date was not clear, but seeing from her maternal families' records date, the Princess was presumed to born in the ended 1174 or early 1175.

Marriage and later life
In 1212, she received her royal title and married her sixth cousin, Wang-Chun, Duke Hawon (왕춘 하원공) as they were same descend from King Hyeonjong. Chun's wife was initially Princess Hyohoe (효회공주), King Sinjong's eldest daughter, but since Hyohoe died only at 17 years old in 1199, so he remarried again with Suryeong.

Although her death date was unknown, but after her death, it was recorded that she was given a Posthumous name of Gyeongryeol (경렬, 敬烈).

References

Year of birth unknown
Year of death unknown
Goryeo princesses